Eastern Canada Air Lines was an airline company based in Moncton, New Brunswick, Canada in the 1930s. The owners included Richard (Dick) Thorne McCully, the company's first managing director. It began operations in 1936 with five General Aircraft Monospar aircraft manufactured by General Aircraft Limited in England.  Three of the aircraft were damaged in accidents, and the company ceased operation in 1938.

See also 
 List of defunct airlines of Canada

References

Airlines established in 1936
Airlines disestablished in 1938
Companies based in Moncton
Defunct airlines of Canada
1936 establishments in New Brunswick
1938 disestablishments in New Brunswick